Vahide is a feminine given name and a feminine derivative of the Persian origin name Vahid. People with the name include:

 Vahide Aydın (born 1968), Austrian-Turkish politician and social worker
 Vahideh Isari (born 1986), Iranian football player
 Vahide Perçin (born 1965), Turkish actress
 Vahideh Taleghani (born c. 1963), Iranian politician

Pen name
 Emine Vahide, pen name of Turkish writer Emine Semiye Önasya

Persian feminine given names
Turkish feminine given names